Vitali Aleksandrovich Lystsov (born 11 July 1995) is a Russian professional footballer who plays as a centre back for Khimki.

Club career
Born in Voronezh and a product of FC Lokomotiv Moscow's football youth department, Lystsov debuted in the Russian Premier League for Lokomotiv Moscow in a match against FC Krasnodar on 24 November 2012. About two years later, he moved to U.D. Leiria in Portugal to play in the country's third-level league.

On 2 February 2015, Lystsov joined Portuguese champions S.L. Benfica on a season-long loan from União de Leiria, and with a buyout clause, being assigned to the former's reserve team in LigaPro. He debuted for Benfica B against Académico de Viseu on 8 February. Later, on 31 May, União Leiria announced that he had signed a five-year contract with Benfica. On 6 July 2016, he was loaned out to Primeira Liga side C.D. Tondela for one season. He then returned to Benfica B in the following season.

On 2 September 2019, he signed a 3-year contract with the Russian Premier League club Krylia Sovetov Samara.

On 3 August 2020, he returned to Lokomotiv Moscow, signing a 4-year contract.

On 23 June 2021, he joined Akhmat Grozny on loan for the 2021–22 season. On 15 July 2022, Lystsov's contract with Lokomotiv was terminated by mutual consent.

Career statistics

References

External links

 
 
 

1995 births
Living people
Footballers from Voronezh
Association football defenders
Russian footballers
Russia youth international footballers
Russia under-21 international footballers
Russian Premier League players
Liga Portugal 2 players
Primeira Liga players
FC Lokomotiv Moscow players
U.D. Leiria players
S.L. Benfica B players
C.D. Tondela players
PFC Krylia Sovetov Samara players
FC Akhmat Grozny players
FC Khimki players
Russian expatriate footballers
Russian expatriate sportspeople in Portugal
Expatriate footballers in Portugal